Jui or JUI may refer to:

 Jamiat Ulema-e-Islam (JUI), a Pakistani religious political party which split in 1988 into JUI-F and JUI-S
 Rui (state) (芮; Jui in Wade–Giles), a Chinese state during the Zhou dynasty 
 Rui (surname) (芮; Jui in Wade–Giles), a Chinese surname
 jui, the ISO 639-3 code for the extinct Ngadjuri language

See also
 Dhakti Jui, a village in Uran Taluka, Raigad District, Maharashtra, India